Crematogaster bakeri is a species of ant in tribe Crematogastrini. It was described by Menozzi in 1925.

References

bakeri
Insects described in 1925